The Northern Kentucky Norse men's basketball team represents Northern Kentucky University in Highland Heights, Kentucky, United States. The school's athletic program began a transition to NCAA Division I in the 2012–13 school year. For the first three seasons of the transition (through 2014–15), it was a member of the Atlantic Sun Conference. In the final season of the transition in 2015–16, the Norse joined the Horizon League. The Norse were coached by John Brannen until April 14, 2019 when he left to take a job with the University of Cincinnati Bearcats. Before him the Norse program's coach was Dave Bezold, who had an overall record of 138 wins and 72 losses.
On April 23, 2019 Darrin Horn was hired as head coach by Northern Kentucky.

History
The program began in 1971, then known as Northern Kentucky State College, played out of Newport High School's gymnasium. The team played its first game on November 12, 1971, against Calvary Bible College; winning 109–65.

Over the past 15 years, NKU became one of the country's premier NCAA Division II college basketball programs. The Norse won three Great Lakes Valley Conference (GLVC) tournament championships in 1994–95, 2002–03, and 2008–09; and GLVC East Division regular season champion in 2006–07, 2007–08, and 2008–09. In NCAA postseason play, NKU made 12 NCAA DII postseason appearances, including back-to-back appearances in the NCAA Men's Division II Basketball Championship in the 1995–96 and 1996–97 seasons.

On December 8, 2011 NKU officially announced it accepted an invitation to join the Atlantic Sun Conference (now known as the ASUN Conference) and begin a multi-year transition to Division I beginning in 2012. The Norse began a full ASUN and Division I schedule in the 2012–13 season, however the university was not eligible for NCAA D-I postseason competition until becoming a full Division I member in 2016.

The team's 2013–14 season schedule featured 3 marquee games against Purdue, Kentucky, and North Carolina. This was also the first season in which the team hosted Division I non-conference home games.

In their first season of eligibility, the Norse qualified for the 2017 NCAA tournament. Northern Kentucky is just the seventh school to make the NCAA tournament in their first year of eligibility.

Postseason

NCAA Division I tournament results
The Norse have appeared in the NCAA Division I Tournament twice. Their record is 0–2.

NCAA Division II tournament results
The Norse have appeared in the NCAA Division II Tournament 13 times. Their combined record is 17–14.

NIT results
The Norse have appeared in the National Invitation Tournament one time. Their record is 0–1.

Awards and honors

All-American
Includes all NKU players designated as Consensus 1st, 2nd, 3rd, and Honorable Mention All-American

Drew McDonald – 2019

Record year-by-year

Facility

Truist Arena opened in 2008 as The Bank of Kentucky Center and serves as the home arena for the NKU Norse men's and women's basketball teams. The 9,200-seat, multi-purpose arena replaced the 1,800-seat Regents Hall, which had served as the home venue since opening in 1973. Regents Hall still serves as the home of women's volleyball and the practice facility for men's and women's basketball.

The arena name has since changed twice—first in 2015 after The Bank of Kentucky was purchased by BB&T, and then in 2022 after BB&T and SunTrust merged to form Truist Financial.

Notes

References

External links
 

 
1971 establishments in Kentucky
Basketball teams established in 1971